Gorod is a version of the Slavic word meaning "town", "city" or "castle", and is related to the similar grad and horod.

It is preserved in the toponymy of numerous Slavic places:

 Bely Gorod
 Belgorod
 Gorodets (with -ets as the suffix of diminutiveness)
 Gorodishche (with -ishche as the suffix of augmentation)
 Ivangorod
 Kitai-gorod
 Kitay-Gorod (Metro), cross-platform transfer point of the Moscow Metro
 Slavgorod
 Nizhny Novgorod
 Veliky Novgorod
 Zvenigorod

See also

 Gord (archaeology)

Slavic toponyms